The Mordvinic languages, also known as the Mordvin, Mordovian or Mordvinian languages (mordovskiye yazyki),
are a subgroup of the Uralic languages, comprising the closely related Erzya language and Moksha language, both spoken in Mordovia.

Previously considered a single "Mordvin language",
it is now treated as a small language grouping. Due to differences in phonology, lexicon, and grammar, Erzya and Moksha are not mutually intelligible. The two Mordvinic languages also have separate literary forms. The Erzya literary language was created in 1922 and the Mokshan in 1923.

Phonological differences between the two languages include:
Moksha has a simple schwa  in their place.
 Word-initially, Erzya has a postalveolar affricate  corresponding to a fricative  in Moksha.

The medieval Meshcherian language may have been Mordvinic or close to Mordvinic.

Classification 

Traditionally, Uralicists grouped the Mordvinic and Mari languages together in the so-called Volgaic branch of the Uralic family; this view was however abandoned in the late 20th century. Instead, some Uralicists now prefer a rapid expansion model, with Mordvinic as one out of nine primary branches of Uralic; others propose a close relation between Mordvinic with the Finnic and Saamic branches of Uralic.

References

 
Languages of Russia
Mordovian culture